Prežganka ("browned" soup with eggs) is Slovenian national soup made of flour, caraway seeds and beaten eggs. The brown color comes from browning the flour in oil or butter. Instead of the flour, breadcrumbs can be used.

Prežganka is a traditional dish from Upper Carniola region.

See also

 List of soups
Slovenian cuisine

References

Slovenian soups